Apilactobacillus apinorum is a Gram-positive, non-spore-forming and non-motile bacterium from the genus of Apilactobacillus which has been isolated from the stomach of a Western honey bee.

References

Lactobacillaceae
Bacteria described in 2014
Bacilli